Neart Na Gaoithe ("strength of the wind" in Gaelic) is an offshore wind farm under construction in the outer Firth of Forth,  north of Torness. It has a potential capacity of 450 MW. It is being developed by EDF Renewables and ESB.  Offshore work began in 2020, with completion originally planned for 2023 but delayed due to supply chain challenges until 2024.

Planning
Mainstream Renewable Power was awarded exclusive rights to develop the wind farm in February 2009. They proposed using 125 3.6MW turbines or 75 6MW turbines to achieve a total capacity of between 420 and 450 megawatts. In 2011, surveyors conducting a detailed preparatory survey of the sea floor published sonar images of the wrecks of the two submarines – K-4 and K-17 – sunk during the Battle of May Island in 1918.

A planning application was submitted in July 2012. The developers said that the wind farm would occupy an area of around 65 square miles, would require between 64 and 125 turbines, and would have a rated capacity of 450MW. The estimated cost was £1.4 billion.

In February 2014 they confirmed that they would be using 75 Siemens SWT-6.0-154 turbines each with a 6 megawatt capacity. A UK government contract was awarded in February 2015. Construction was expected to begin in 2015, but in January 2015 the RSPB submitted a legal challenge citing concerns over the impact on seabirds. The case was heard at the Court of Session in Edinburgh in May 2015. In May 2017 the same court overturned a July 2016 block of the project. An RSPB appeal was denied in July 2017.

The project was acquired in May 2018 by EDF and is expected to be commissioned in 2023. In December 2018, permission was received from the Scottish government to reduce the number of turbines to 54 while maintaining the same overall capacity. Construction began in August 2020. The wind farm was expected to be operational by 2023 but due to supply chain challenges EDF announced in 2022 that completion would be delayed to summer 2024.

Construction
Work on the offshore elements of the wind farm began in August 2020. Two 37 km long high-voltage export cables will bring the electricity back to the landfall at Thorntonloch Beach, near Bilsdean on the coast of East Lothian. The shore-side ends of the cables were winched through 650m long horizontal drill ducts under the beach to join with the onshore cable. The offshore cables were then laid across the sea-bed by the installation vessel 'Cable Enterprise', before being buried under the seabed by remotely-operated submarine. The first of the cables was laid out to its offshore substation by 18 June 2021, with the second expected during July 2021.

Work continued in September 2021 when two shunt reactors were delivered to the Lammermuir Hills site by Collett Transport.  Originating overseas, the shunt reactors travelled over 5000 miles to the Port of Leith in Scotland before onward transport to the substation site.

In January 2022 two 180-tonne super grid transformers were delivered to the onshore substation. The first substation installation completed on 8 June 2022.

See also

Wind power in Scotland
List of offshore wind farms

References

External links
Neart na Gaoithe Offshore Wind Farm

Offshore wind farms in the North Sea
Proposed wind farms in Scotland